Frontlines: Fuel of War is a first-person shooter game for Microsoft Windows and  Xbox 360. It was released February 25, 2008 in North America. It was produced by the now-defunct Kaos Studios. Frontlines: Fuel of War was also originally in development for the PlayStation 3, although THQ announced it had canceled work on this version on January 24, 2008, seemingly as a result of problems with developing for the PlayStation 3, issues that had been referenced in interviews prior to the PlayStation 3 version's cancellation.

Frontlines includes a multiplayer mode as well as a single-player campaign that uses the Frontlines system found in the multiplayer component. Single-player mode limits the players to the fictional Western Coalition, while online modes let players play as either the Western Coalition (WC) or Red Star Alliance (RSA). It is not bot compatible. A multiplayer demo of the game was released for the Xbox 360 on February 11, 2008. A demo was also released for the PC. Towards the end of 2012, the PC online multiplayer mode of the game was no longer available, although the LAN mode still operates.

Gameplay 

The gameplay focuses on a central mechanic, the frontline. This is designed to keep the action in one place, by focusing objectives closer together on the battlefield. The frontline also has bonuses. By moving it back and forth across the battlefield, the player may gain or lose weapons and equipment. The frontline mechanic is used in all game types, which forces players to choose which objectives they will pursue or defend, adding a strategic level to the gameplay.

The UCAV Drone plays a crucial role in gathering information in real time on the battlefield. The drone reconnoiters enemy units, which are visible through walls, and then shows them on the player's HUD and map. Some drones can also be used as a kamikaze bomb, by running them into enemy infantry and self destructing them.

There are four other drones, the Assault Drone, a small treaded vehicle with a mounted Gatling gun, a Mortar Drone, with a mounted four barrelled mortar, an RC drone, which can be packed with C4 and used to destroy armored targets and finally a variant of the UAV drone equipped with anti-infantry rockets.

In an interview, Kaos stated that there would be more than 60 vehicles and weapons in the final game.
Airstrikes will also play a large part in gameplay, being an effective way to destroy an opposing force from a distance.

In an interview with developer Joe Halper, Kaos has stated that 32 player multiplayer would be supported for the console version. Near release the maximum player count was raised to 50. The PC version of the game supports 64 players online. Near release it was confirmed that the game would not support cross-platform play, but the developers have stated that they are considering eventually moving the franchise towards becoming a Live Anywhere title.

Maps 

Frontlines shipped with a total of eight multiplayer maps. Kaos Studios stated they were looking into releasing extra maps in the future as downloadable content.

This began with the brand new map: "Boneyard". The map was released as a free download on Xbox 360's Marketplace. The map not only offered another well-sized map, but more weapons and vehicles. This included: an all-new Automatic Shotgun, a Carrier Helicopter for the Red Star Alliance, and a "Rocket Jeep".

In addition, the downloadable content clearly stated that this new map was the first of five to be released. The other four maps are named "Sunder", "Wide Awake", "Hind Sight", and "Infiltration". On September 19, Kaos released these maps on Xbox Live. These were later released for the PC as a free download patch.

Dedicated servers 

The game features dedicated servers similar to Battlefield 2: Modern Combat as well as client-side hosting found in the majority of Live-enabled Xbox 360 games. This is done in order to support the 50 player limit, which was unprecedented on the console. The dedicated servers have been shut down of August 31, 2011. Although client-side hosting is still available, servers can only support a 16-player maximum.

Synopsis 

By 2024, a global energy crisis and a worldwide avian influenza outbreak plague the world. As supplies of oil and natural gas wane and with alternative energy like solar power, bio-fuel, and nuclear energy still insufficient to replace oil completely, diplomatic relationships between the East and West are strained, causing two new alliances to be formed, the Western Coalition, an evolution of NATO, and the Red Star Alliance, an evolution of the Shanghai Cooperation Organisation. Red Star launches a surprise attack on the Western Coalition in retaliation to proof of the Coalition supporting a coup d'état in the oil-rich Red Star member nation Turkmenistan in 2021. As the last oil fields in the Caspian Sea start to go dry, the countries move to secure what resources are left, leading to several small outbreaks that turn quickly into full-scale war.

The player steps in the shoes of the members of a violent and battle-hardened Western Coalition strike force nicknamed the "Stray Dogs" that are to spearhead assaults against defensive positions of Red Star across Central Asia and Eastern Europe, as Red Star tries to secure resources in the best of worldwide interest. Wayne Andrews, a reporter for the Affiliated Press throughout the game, joins the Stray Dogs.

The game ends after the final mission entitled "History Repeats," upon bringing the Russian military to a collapse and cutting the nation off from the rest of the world by destroying a satellite uplink. As pockets of resistance are hunted down by Coalition forces across Moscow, a questionable future is proposed by Andrews, stating that the Russians are forming a government in exile, and Chinese troops are amassing on the border. In the final cutscene, Andrews states that he wishes to live to see humanity being anew and manage to solve the energy crisis with more research on alternatives like nuclear fusion. The game ends by showing Red Star fighter jets opening fire on Andrews, leaving the story open for a sequel.

Development

Downloadable content

As well as gamer pictures and three Frontlines themes for the Xbox 360 dashboard, along with various gameplay videos from the developers, a new game mode was released for download. Called 'Conquer' it allows the game to be played in a similar way to that of Battlefield 2: Modern Combat, in that instead of trying to push the Frontline forward, all spawn points are available for capture by both teams.  To win, one team must capture all points on the map, and eliminate the other team.

Retail bonuses 

A Collector's Edition of the game was released in the UK, Australia, Denmark, and New Zealand. The Xbox 360 Collector's Edition contained a T-shirt, an Art of Frontlines book, a poster, and a bonus disk containing the game sound, behind the scenes videos, and more. The PC Collector's Edition contained an official strategy guide, Stray Dogs insignia patch, a deck of Frontlines playing cards, an Art of Frontlines book, a poster, and a Steelbook case. This edition was never released in North America. In Denmark the PC Collector's Edition contained a "Stray Dogs" T-shirt, an art book, a CD with the soundtrack and a 60X42cm poster and sold as a Special Edition instead of Collector's Edition.

Players who ordered Frontlines: Fuel of War from GameStop or Best Buy were given a special code which gave access to one of two Challenge Maps. This code has since been distributed on the Internet. Players who purchased Frontlines: Fuel of War from Circuit City received a copy of the Frontlines: Fuel of War soundtrack. Players who ordered Frontlines from online retailer Amazon.com were given a limited edition Collector's Tin.

Alternate reality game 

THQ announced the launch of an alternate reality game for Frontlines: Fuel of War in order to promote the game via a website. Visitors are challenged to unearth the mystery surrounding Exeo Incorporated by finding ten passwords scattered across the internet. Users who find all 10 passwords were eligible to win a grand prize, including fighter pilot training, and a complimentary copy of the game.

References

External links 
  (archived)

2008 video games
First-person shooters
Cancelled PlayStation 3 games
Games for Windows certified games
THQ games
Unreal Engine games
Video games set in the 2020s
Fiction set in 2024
Science fiction shooter video games
Windows games
Xbox 360 games
Multiplayer and single-player video games
World War III video games
Peak oil
Video games set in Turkmenistan
Video games set in Kazakhstan
Video games set in Tajikistan
Video games set in Russia
Video games set in Moscow
Video games set in Ukraine
Fiction about the People's Liberation Army
Military of the United States in fiction
Video games developed in the United States